The untitled third album by Royal Trux was released on October 5, 1992, by Drag City.

Track listing

Personnel 
Royal Trux
Neil Hagerty – vocals, guitar, keyboards
Jennifer Herrema – vocals, keyboards
Production and additional personnel
Richard – engineering
Trip – engineering
Royal Trux – production

References

External links 
 

1992 albums
Royal Trux albums
Drag City (record label) albums
Domino Recording Company albums